Star Search is a television show from 1988 to 2019 organised by MediaCorp to scout for Chinese language-speaking acting talent.

History
Star Search started out as a Singapore local talent show, restricted to residents of Singapore. After the Singapore Broadcasting Corporation discontinued its drama training courses in the early 1990s, Star Search became one of Channel 8's main sources to scout for talent. In 1999, the show expanded to include regions such as Malaysia, Hong Kong, Taiwan and Guangzhou (China). From 1999 to 2003, the show took the format of a knockout competition where the male and female champions and first runners-up from each country will go to Singapore compete for the overall champion prize in their respective genders.

Back after a four-year hiatus and into its 9th installment, Star Search 2007 marks the return of the mother of talent search programs in Singapore. Many of its "alumni" have gone on to have successful careers in showbiz with MediaCorp and elsewhere. A tenth installment returned again in 2010.

On April 14, 2019, the 11th series of Star Search was announced during the Star Awards 2019, with auditions announced starting on May, returning after a nine-year hiatus.

Format
Auditions typically take place several months beforehand. The chosen contestants are sent for training and begin rehearsing. Finalists are usually mentored by veteran MediaCorp artists. There are different segments to test the contestant in several areas. In the acting segment the contestant acts out a skit prepared beforehand, which often features a current MediaCorp artist. While it is scripted, the artist may improvise to test the contestant's ability to do so. In the Q & A segment, contestants are tested on their oratorical skills by answering a randomly chosen question on the spot. In the performance segment, each contestant is to perform a special item and are judged on their charisma, confidence and ability to perform under pressure.

They are judged by a panel consisting of both local and foreign celebrities. Past judges have included Anita Mui, Chow Yun-fat, Alfred Cheung and Andy Lau.

The winner would be awarded a full-time contract with MediaCorp besides the prizes. Other finalists deemed suitable enough are often given contracts as well.

Past winners

Past contestants

Chen Hanwei 陈汉玮 (1988)
Peter Yu 余宏荣 (1990)
Ann Kok 郭舒贤 (1993)
Yao Wenlong 姚玟隆 (1993)
Carole Lin 林晓佩 (1995)
Brandon Wong 黄炯耀 (1995)
Yvonne Lim 林湘萍 (1997)
Vincent Ng 翁清海 (1997)
Constance Song 宋怡霏 (1997)
Joey Swee 徐绮 (1997)
Evelyn Tan 陈毓芸 (1997)
Apple Hong 洪乙心 (1999)
Priscelia Chan 曾诗梅 (1999)
Zzen Zhang 章缜翔 (2001)
Melvin Sia 谢佳见 (2003)
Tracy Lee 李美玲 (2007)
Robin Goh 吴罗宾 (1995)
Dennis Toh 卓庆成 （2001）

See also
Star Idol
Star Search 2003
Star Search 2007
Star Search 2010
Star Search 2019

References

External links
Star Search 2007 - Official Website
Star Search 2007 - Mediacorp English Forum
Star Search 2007 - Mediacorp Chinese Forum

Mediacorp
Singaporean reality television series